= Diving at the 2010 South American Games – Women's 10 m platform =

The Women's 10m Platform event at the 2010 South American Games was held on March 21 at 14:30.

== Medalists ==
Gold	Silver	Bronze
Diana Isabel Zuleta; Colombia	Milena Sae; Brazil	Carolina Urrea; Colombia

== Results ==
Rank	Athlete	Dives					Result
Rank	Athlete	1	2	3	4	5	Result
1st place, gold medalist(s)	Diana Isabel Zuleta (COL)	51.75	56.70	65.80	72.50	72.80	319.55
2nd place, silver medalist(s)	Milena Sae (BRA)	62.35	54.00	57.40	54.00	69.60	297.35
3rd place, bronze medalist(s)	Carolina Urrea (COL)	42.75	44.10	55.90	65.10	48.40	256.25
4	Nicoli Cruz (BRA)	56.00	65.25	61.50	27.55	39.15	249.45
5	Rafaela Suarez Ramos (ECU)	50.40	54.00	51.75	42.00	28.90	337.05
6	Gabriela Gutierrez (ECU)	34.80	54.00	42.55	28.35	26.25	185.95
